Argo Wilis is an executive class train operated by PT Kereta Api Indonesia between Surabaya and Bandung in Java, Indonesia. This train runs in the morning from Bandung to Surabaya Gubeng or vice versa, and arrives at the destination at night. In the journey  Bandung to Surabaya, passengers can enjoy the beautiful panorama of the eastern part of Parahyangan mountainous region.

Etymology

The train service was inaugurated on November 8, 1998.

On December 1, 2019 Argo Wilis extended to Jakarta (Gambir station) via Cikampek-Padalarang line, and Argo Wilis added stops station at Jatinegara (only from Surabaya), & Cimahi.

Facilities
The train consists of 7-9 executive passenger coach, 1 dining car, and 1 power carriage. The train has capacity for 350-400 passengers. 

The train has received the latest series from INKA since its launch in 1998. However, because some of the 1998 executive freight trains were also allocated to the Argo Dwipangga, some 1995 executive trains owned by KA Argo Gede were often used especially if the train needs a long series. As of June 2018, Argo Wilis used trains that varied between Argo executive trains made in 1995, 1996, 1998 and 2002, and other trains, and often exchanged trains with Argo Parahyangan. Since June 8, 2018, Argo Wilis has officially used the latest executive train which has a 2018 stainless steel body made by PT INKA Madiun, complete with a new train and generator train. The train uses CC206 locomotive. Previously used locomotive were CC203, CC201, and CC204.

See also 
 Kereta Api Indonesia
 Rail transport in Indonesia
 List of named passenger trains of Indonesia
Argo Bromo Anggrek

References

External links 
 

Passenger rail transport in Indonesia
Rail transport in Indonesia
Surabaya
Bandung